Utande is a municipality located in the province of Guadalajara, Castile-La Mancha, Spain. At the 2004 census (INE) the municipality had a population of 53 inhabitants.

References 

Municipalities in the Province of Guadalajara